Moncur is a surname. Notable people with the surname include:

 Alexander Moncur (1888–1976), New Zealand politician
 Avard Moncur (born 1978), Bahamian track and field athlete
 Bobby Moncur (born 1945), Scottish footballer
 Craig-James Moncur, Scottish actor and producer
 Eric Moncur (born 1984), American footballer
 George Moncur (born 1993), British footballer
 Grachan Moncur III (1937-2022), American jazz trombonist
 John Moncur (born 1966), British footballer
 TJ Moncur, (born 1987), British footballer